= Indan (weapon) =

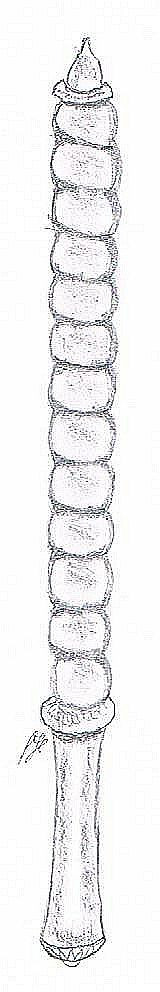
- Type: Club
- Place of origin: Indonesia, Java

Service history
- Used by: Javanese people, Sundanese people

Specifications
- Blade type: Wood, metal
- Hilt type: Wood

The Indan is a club from Java.

== Description ==
The Indan is straight and has a twisted, elongated striking head. The handle is smooth and rounded at the pommel. A metal plate, which is worked out in the shape of a flower, serves as the end. The front end is finished with a kind of crown. The shape of the Indan goes back to a mythological weapon used by gods and heroes in Indonesian myths. The Indan is used by ethnic groups from Java.
